Edward Madden (July 17, 1878 – March 11, 1952) was an American lyricist.

Early life 
Madden was born in New York City and graduated from Fordham University. After graduation, he wrote material for many singers including Fanny Brice and for vaudeville acts. He eventually worked for the Broadway stage.

Works 
During his career he worked with Ben Jerome, Dorothy Jardon, Joseph Daly, Gus Edwards, Julian Edwards, Louis Hirsch, Theodore Morse, Percy Wenrich and Jerome Kern.

Madden produced such standards as “By the Light of the Silvery Moon”, “On Moonlight Bay”, “Down in Jungle Town”, “Blue Bell”, “Look Out for Jimmy Valentine”, “Aren't You the Wise Ole Owl”, “My Only One”, “What Could Be Sweeter?”, “The World Can't Go ‘Round Without You”, “Red Rose Rag”, “Silver Bell”, “Arra Wanna”, “I've Got a Feelin' for You”, “A Little Boy Called Taps”, "It Takes the Irish to Beat the Dutch" and “I'd Rather Be a Lobster Than a Wise Guy”.

Madden and composer Theodore Morse wrote the American Civil War song "Two Little Boys".
 
Madden's songs have been included in several films, including Turn Back the Clock, Babes in Arms, Tin Pan Alley, Bullets for O'Hara, Birth of the Blues, Ship Ahoy, On Moonlight Bay and By the Light of the Silvery Moon.

Personal life 
Madden married his colleague, Dorothy Jardon. Son, Edward Madden Jr.

Death 
He died in Hollywood, California in March 1952 at the age of 73.

References

External links

Songwriters Hall of Fame
By the Light of the Silvery Moon
 
 
 Edward Madden recordings at the Discography of American Historical Recordings.

1878 births
1952 deaths
Songwriters from New York (state)
Fordham University alumni